Emulsifying wax is a cosmetic emulsifying ingredient. The ingredient name is often followed by the initials NF, indicating that it conforms to the specifications of the National Formulary.

Emulsifying wax is created when a wax material (either a vegetable wax of some kind or a petroleum-based wax) is treated with a detergent (typically sodium dodecyl sulfate or polysorbates) to cause it to make oil and water bind together into a smooth emulsion. It is a white waxy solid with a low fatty alcohol odor.

According to the United States Pharmacopoeia - National Formulary (USP-NF), the ingredients for emulsifying wax NF are cetearyl alcohol and a polyoxyethylene derivative of a fatty acid ester of sorbitan (a polysorbate).

In a cosmetic product, if the emulsifying wax used meets the standards for the National Formulary, it may be listed in the ingredient declaration by the term "emulsifying wax NF".  Otherwise, the emulsifier is considered a blended ingredient and the individual components must be listed individually in the ingredient declaration, placed appropriately in descending order of predominance in the whole.

References

Waxes